Elbert County is a county located in the northeastern part of the U.S. state of Georgia. As of the 2020 census, the population was 19,637. The county seat is Elberton. The county was established on December 10, 1790, and was named for Samuel Elbert.

Geography
The county is located in the Piedmont region of the state.

The northern half of Elbert County, north of a line made by following State Route 17 from Bowman southeast to Elberton, and then following State Route 72 east to just before the South Carolina border, and then heading south along the shores of Lake Richard B. Russell & Clarkes Hill to the county's southeastern tip, is located in the Upper Savannah River sub-basin of the larger Savannah River basin.  The portion of the county south of this line is located in the Broad River sub-basin of the Savannah River basin.

Major highways
  State Route 17
  State Route 72
  State Route 77
  State Route 77 Connector
  State Route 79
  State Route 172
  State Route 368

Adjacent counties

 Anderson County, South Carolina (northeast)
 Abbeville County, South Carolina (east)
 McCormick County, South Carolina (southeast)
 Lincoln County (southeast)
 Wilkes County (south)
 Oglethorpe County (southwest)
 Madison County (west)
 Hart County (north)
 Franklin County (northwest)

Demographics

2000 census
As of the census of 2000, there were 20,511 people, 8,004 households, and 5,770 families living in the county.  The population density was 56 people per square mile (21/km2).  There were 9,136 housing units at an average density of 25 per square mile (10/km2).  The racial makeup of the county was 66.94% White, 30.85% Black or African American, 0.20% Native American, 0.24% Asian, 0.03% Pacific Islander, 1.06% from other races, and 0.68% from two or more races.  2.38% of the population were Hispanic or Latino of any race.

There were 8,004 households, out of which 32.00% had children under the age of 18 living with them, 51.90% were married couples living together, 15.70% had a female householder with no husband present, and 27.90% were non-families. 25.00% of all households were made up of individuals, and 11.60% had someone living alone who was 65 years of age or older.  The average household size was 2.53 and the average family size was 3.01.

In the county, the population was spread out, with 25.80% under the age of 18, 8.40% from 18 to 24, 27.20% from 25 to 44, 23.60% from 45 to 64, and 14.90% who were 65 years of age or older.  The median age was 37 years. For every 100 females there were 92.20 males.  For every 100 females age 18 and over, there were 88.50 males.

The median income for a household in the county was $28,724, and the median income for a family was $34,276. Males had a median income of $27,221 versus $19,737 for females. The per capita income for the county was $14,535.  About 14.60% of families and 17.30% of the population were below the poverty line, including 23.50% of those under age 18 and 17.20% of those age 65 or over.

2010 census
As of the 2010 United States Census, there were 20,166 people, 8,063 households, and 5,604 families living in the county. The racial makeup of the county was 65.9% white, 29.5% black or African American, 0.6% Asian, 0.2% American Indian, 2.7% from other races, and 1.0% from two or more races. Those of Hispanic or Latino origin made up 4.8% of the population. In terms of ancestry, 18.1% were American, 6.0% were Irish, 5.7% were English, and 5.5% were German.

Of the 8,063 households, 31.9% had children under the age of 18 living with them, 47.9% were married couples living together, 16.5% had a female householder with no husband present, 30.5% were non-families, and 26.9% of all households were made up of individuals. The average household size was 2.47 and the average family size was 2.98. The median age was 41.1 years.

The median income for a household in the county was $30,543 and the median income for a family was $35,550. Males had a median income of $31,556 versus $25,562 for females. The per capita income for the county was $17,100. About 17.0% of families and 23.0% of the population were below the poverty line, including 39.9% of those under age 18 and 11.8% of those age 65 or over.

2020 census

As of the 2020 United States Census, there were 19,637 people, 7,559 households, and 5,065 families residing in the county.

Judiciary and government 

Elbert County is part of the Northern Judicial Circuit of Georgia, which also includes the counties of Hart, Franklin, Madison, and Oglethorpe.  Elbert County's governing authority, the Elbert County Board of Commissioners, has five Commissioners elected in districts, a Chairperson elected County-wide, and an appointed County Administrator.

Politics

Historical and cultural sites 

Historical and cultural sites in Elbert County include the Nancy Hart cabin, the Dan Tucker gravesite, the Stephen Heard Cemetery, the Petersburg Township site, Vans Creek Church, the Elbert County Courthouse, the Elberton Seaboard-Airline Depot, the Rock Gym, the Granite Bowl, the Elberton Granite Museum and Exhibit, the Richard B. Russell Dam, the Elbert Theatre, Richard B. Russell State Park, and Bobby Brown Park. The Georgia Guidestones stood in Elbert County from 1980 until their destruction in 2022.

Communities

Cities
 Bowman
 Elberton

Census-designated place
 Dewy Rose

Unincorporated communities
 Hard Cash
 Ruckersville

Ghost town
 Petersburg

See also

 National Register of Historic Places listings in Elbert County, Georgia
 Georgia Guidestones

References

External links
 

 
1790 establishments in Georgia (U.S. state)
Georgia (U.S. state) counties
Northeast Georgia
Counties of Appalachia
Populated places established in 1790